Caspar Butz (October 23, 1825 – October 19, 1885) was a German American journalist and politician, born in Hagen, Kingdom of Prussia, who served as a member of the Illinois House of Representatives from 1858 to 1860 and as City Clerk of Chicago from 1876 to 1879.

Biography
Butz was a Forty Eighter who immigrated to the United States in 1851, settling first in Boston. A journalist by trade, he quickly became politically active and joined the newly created Republican Party, serving as a political writer for both the Frémont and Lincoln campaigns. Butz himself was elected to the Illinois House of Representatives in 1858, where he served alongside Ebenezer Peck as Representative from the 57th District.
Butz was actively involved in German language journalism in the United States, and held several positions in a number of publications, including the Illinois Staats-Zeitung and the Michigan Tribune, the latter of which he briefly owned.

Butz died in Des Moines, Iowa in 1885, at the age of 59.

References

1825 births
1885 deaths
American newspaper editors
Republican Party members of the Illinois House of Representatives
German emigrants to the United States
Journalists from Illinois
19th-century American journalists
American male journalists
German revolutionaries
Burials at Graceland Cemetery (Chicago)
German-American Forty-Eighters
Publishers (people) of German-language newspapers in the United States
People from Hagen
Politicians from Chicago
19th-century American male writers
19th-century American politicians
Illinois Staats-Zeitung people